Šmartno (or San Martino di Quisca) is a village in the Municipality of Brda in the Littoral region of Slovenia. The entire village has been declared a cultural heritage monument.

The parish church, from which the settlement also gets its name, is dedicated to Saint Martin and belongs to the Koper Diocese.

References

External links

Šmartno on Geopedia

Populated places in the Municipality of Brda